CSI: Crime Scene Investigation premiered on October 6, 2000. Since then, fifteen seasons have been broadcast. 

The first season consisted of 23 episodes, including a two-part pilot episode written by series creator Anthony E. Zuiker. Seasons two, three, and four also had 23 episodes each, while season five had 25 episodes, including a two-part season finale directed by Quentin Tarantino. During seasons six and seven, the episode count was 24, whereas season eight had 17 episodes due to the WGA strike. Season nine had 24 episodes, and season ten returned to the series standard of 23 episodes. Seasons eleven, twelve, thirteen, and fourteen set a new standard of 22 episodes per season, but the fifteenth season received a reduced order of 18 episodes. The two-hour series finale was aired on September 27, 2015.

The first nine seasons have been released on DVD in Region 1 and Region 2 territories. Seasons 1, 8 (only in France, The Netherlands, Belgium and Germany), 9 (not in Belgium and Germany) and 10 (only in Germany) have been released on Blu-ray Disc.

Series overview

Episodes

Season 1 (2000–01)

 Jorja Fox (Sara Sidle) joined the main cast in the second episode ("Cool Change").
 Eric Szmanda (Greg Sanders), Robert David Hall (Al Robbins), and David Berman (David Phillips) all had continuous arcs throughout the whole season.

Season 2 (2001–02)

Season 3 (2002–03)

 Eric Szmanda (Greg Sanders) and Robert David Hall (Dr. Al Robbins) were promoted to the main cast as of this season.
 Wallace Langham (David Hodges) had a continuous arc starting with the eleventh episode, "Recipe for Murder".

Season 4 (2003–04)

Season 5 (2004–05)

 Louise Lombard (Sofia Curtis) and Jon Wellner (Henry Andrews) both had continuous arcs throughout the whole season.

Season 6 (2005–06)

 Liz Vassey (Wendy Simms) had a continuous arc starting with the sixth episode ("Secrets and Flies").

Season 7 (2006–07)

 Louise Lombard (Sofia Curtis) was promoted to the main cast as of this season, and then she leaves the show after the season finale ("Living Doll").
 David Berman (David Phillips), Wallace Langham (David Hodges), Jon Wellner (Henry Andrews), and Liz Vassey (Wendy Simms) all had continuous arcs throughout the whole season.

Season 8 (2007–08)

 Wallace Langham (David Hodges) was promoted to the main cast as of this season.
 Jorja Fox (Sara Sidle) departed the show after the seventh episode, "Goodbye & Good Luck".

Season 9 (2008–09)

 Gary Dourdan (Warrick Brown) departed the series after the season premiere, "For Warrick".
 William Petersen (Gil Grissom) left the show after the tenth episode, "One to Go".
 Laurence Fishburne as (Raymond Langston) was introduced in the ninth episode, "19 Down…", and was later promoted to the main cast in the eleventh episode, "The Grave Shift".

Season 10 (2009–10)

 David Berman (David Phillips) and Liz Vassey (Wendy Simms) were promoted to the main cast as of this season. Liz Vassey departed in the season finale. ("Meat Jekyll").
 Jorja Fox (Sara Sidle) and Jon Wellner (Henry Andrews) both had a continuous arc throughout the whole season.

Season 11 (2010–11)

 Jorja Fox (Sara Sidle) rejoins the main cast as of this season.
 Laurence Fishburne (Raymond Langston) departed the series after the season finale "In a Dark, Dark House".

Season 12 (2011–12)

 Ted Danson (D.B. Russell) and Elisabeth Harnois (Morgan Brody) join the cast.
 Marg Helgenberger (Catherine Willows) departed the show in episode 12, "Willows in the Wind".
 Elisabeth Shue (Julie Finlay) was promoted to the main cast in the fourteenth episode ("Seeing Red").

Season 13 (2012–13)

 Jon Wellner (Henry Andrews) was promoted to the main cast as of this season.

Season 14 (2013–14)

 Paul Guilfoyle (Jim Brass) departed the series after the season finale ("Dead in His Tracks").

Season 15 (2014–15) 

 Elisabeth Shue (Julie Finlay) and George Eads (Nick Stokes) departed the series after the season finale "The End Game".

Finale (2015)

Ted Danson, Jorja Fox, Eric Szmanda, Robert David Hall, Wallace Langham, Elisabeth Harnois, David Berman, and Jon Wellner star. William Petersen and Marg Helgenberger return. Paul Guilfoyle guest stars in Part 1.

Notes

Webisodes (2012)

Ratings

Home video releases

DVD

Blu-ray 
Season 1 was released on May 12, 2009 on Blu-ray and was labeled as a special widescreen edition.

Season 9 was released on September 1, 2009 on Blu-ray.

See also
 CSI (franchise)
 List of CSI: Miami episodes
 List of CSI: NY episodes
 List of CSI: Cyber episodes

References

Lists of American crime drama television series episodes

it:CSI - Scena del crimine#Episodi